is the fourth album released by the Japanese metal band Aion. The band's catchphrase "Deathrash Bound" is written on the cover, and since the album's full title is only written on the side, this is often mistaken to be the album's title (adding to the confusion, the band's first album was actually titled Deathrash Bound). The term appears on several of their albums, later the band created their own record label entitled "Deathrash Bound". The first pressing came in a cardboard slipcover. A PV for the song "Aion -Aion-" was made to promote the album. This is their last full-length album to feature drummer S.A.B (he is on the EP Sei-Aion, released later in the year), until his return on their 2000 album Sister (in 2009 he left again).

Track listing

Personnel
Nov – vocals
Izumi – lead and rhythm guitars
Dean – bass guitar
S.A.B – drums

References

1992 albums
Aion (Japanese band) albums